Heterobathmia valvifer is a moth of the family Heterobathmiidae. It was described by Kristensen and Nielsen in 1998. It is found in temperate South America.

References

Moths described in 1998
Moths of South America
Heterobathmiina
Taxa named by Ebbe Nielsen